Redcar British Steel (also known as British Steel Redcar) is a "mothballed" railway station on the Tees Valley Line, which runs between  and  via . At the time of the station's closure, it was owned by Network Rail and managed by Arriva Rail North.

History 
The station was opened by British Rail on 19 June 1978. It is situated on a re-sited portion of route that was commissioned to allow the previous alignment to be used for an expansion of the Teesside Steelworks.

In the 2014–15 period, the Office of Rail and Road recorded a total of 1,570 entries and exits. In 2015, the majority of the Teesside Steelworks closed, resulting in a drop in passenger usage of the station.

In the 2016–17 period the entries and exits dropped to fifty, making it the fourth least-used station in Britain. In the 2017–18 period, it was named the least used station in Britain with only forty entries and exits, surpassing .

The station saw a significant increase in passengers in the 2018–19 and 2019–20 periods, with 360 and 1,060 entries and exits respectively, which was likely attributed to its "least-used" status. This "least-used" status was highlighted in Geoff Marshall's video about the station.

Arriva Rail North suspended services from the station on 14 December 2019, and as of September 2022, services have not resumed. However, work to regenerate the site of the former Teesside Steelworks is being undertaken by South Tees Development Corporation, which aims to redevelop the station and improve services.

Facilities
At the time of the station's closure, it had two platforms, both of which had very basic amenities. There was a waiting shelter on both platforms, as well as timetable posters. There was no step-free access between platforms, which could be accessed only by a metal footbridge.

Services

At the time of closure, the station was served by four trains per day. Heading west, two trains per day operated to Bishop Auckland, both of which commenced at Saltburn. All services were operated by Arriva Rail North.

Rolling stock used: Class 142 Pacer, Class 156 Super Sprinter and Class 158 Express Sprinter

References

Notes

External links
 
 

Disused railway stations in Redcar and Cleveland
Railway stations in Great Britain opened in 1978
Railway stations in Great Britain closed in 2019
Railway stations opened by British Rail
Railway stations in Great Britain without public access
Low usage railway stations in the United Kingdom
Redcar